General Drummond may refer to:

Gordon Drummond (1772–1854), Canadian-born British Army general
Laurence Drummond (1861–1946), British Army major general
Percy Drummond (died 1843), British Army major general
James Drummond, 3rd Duke of Perth (1713–1746), Scottish Jacobite Army lieutenant general
William Drummond, 1st Viscount Strathallan (c. 1617–1688), Scottish forces major general and Muscovite Army lieutenant general

See also
Attorney General Drummond (disambiguation)